Ultimate Collection is the compilation by worship leader Matt Redman which features songs from his studio and live albums.

Track listing

2010 compilation albums
Matt Redman albums